Boynton Beach may refer to:

Boynton Beach, Florida
Boynton Beach, New Jersey